Reginald Francis Edward Saphin (8 August 1916 – 23 December 2005) was an English professional footballer who played in the Football League for Watford and Queens Park Rangers as a goalkeeper. He later served Watford as assistant trainer and assistant youth team trainer.

Career statistics

References

English footballers
Footballers from Kilburn, London
Hayes F.C. players
English Football League players
Association football goalkeepers
1916 births
2005 deaths
Walthamstow Avenue F.C. players
Brentford F.C. wartime guest players
Ipswich Town F.C. wartime guest players
Queens Park Rangers F.C. players
Watford F.C. players
Watford F.C. non-playing staff